cwt is the abbreviation for hundredweight (cwt = centum weight), an English, imperial, and US customary unit of weight.

CWT or cwt may also refer to:

Enterprises and organizations
 CWT (company), Carlson Wagonlit Travel, a travel management company
 Cadwalader, Wickersham & Taft, a New York law firm
 California Water Service Group, a public utility (NYSE ticker symbol: CWT)
 Changing World Technologies, a synthetic fuel company
 Cheshire Wildlife Trust, an English charity
 Colorado Water Trust, an American non-profit
 Cooperatives Working Together, an American dairy organization
 Cornwall Wildlife Trust, an English charity

Science and technology
 Center wing fuel tank (CWT), a crucial airplane structure that contributed to the crash of TWA Flight 800
 Coded wire tag, an animal tagging device
 Complex wavelet transform, an extension to the standard discrete wavelet transform used in image processing
 Constant with temperature, a term used in bandgap voltage reference
 Continuous wavelet transform, a formal representation of a signal in mathematics
 CBOR Web Token, a proposed Internet standard for encoding JSON Web Token-style tokens in binary form

Other uses
 Kwatay language, spoken in Senegal (ISO 639 code: cwt)
 Cowra Airport, New South Wales, Australia (IATA code: CWT)
 Central Western Time, an Australian time zone
 Chief Water Tender, a former paygrade for a  watertender in the U.S. Navy
 Constant weight, a freediving discipline